The United States Senate Select Committee on Disarmament was a committee organized in the U.S. Senate.  It has since been disbanded.

Disarmament
Arms control
Disarmament